The Commander of the Defence Force is the professional head of the Royal Bahamas Defence Force. He is  responsible for the administration and the operational control of the Defence Force. The current commander is Raymond King, who was appointed on 21 May 2020, after serving as acting commander since 16 October 2019.

List of commanders

References

Military of the Bahamas
Bahamas